Alan Hunt (born 27 September 1959) is a former New Zealand cricketer. He played 67 first-class and 37 List A matches for Auckland between 1980 and 1993.

See also
 List of Auckland representative cricketers

References

External links
 

1959 births
Living people
New Zealand cricketers
Auckland cricketers
Cricketers from Dunedin